L'Assomption (The Assumption) is a regional county municipality in the Lanaudière region of Quebec, Canada. The seat is L'Assomption. L'Assomption is located directly north of the city of Montreal.

It is named for the L'Assomption River, which flows through the region from the north before emptying into the Saint Lawrence River in the south of the region at Repentigny.

Subdivisions
There are 5 subdivisions within the RCM:

Cities & Towns (4)
 Charlemagne
 L'Assomption
 L'Épiphanie
 Repentigny

Parishes (1)
 Saint-Sulpice

Demographics

Population

Language

Transportation

Access Routes
Highways and numbered routes that run through the municipality, including external routes that start or finish at the county border:

 Autoroutes
 
 

 Principal Highways
 

 Secondary Highways
 
 
 

 External Routes
 None

See also
 List of regional county municipalities and equivalent territories in Quebec

References

Regional county municipalities in Lanaudière
Census divisions of Quebec